Mesosa niasica is a species of beetle in the family Cerambycidae. It was described by Stephan von Breuning in 1935. It is known from Sumatra and Java.

References

niasica
Beetles described in 1935